Emil Petkov (born 16 July 1980) is a former Bulgarian footballer, who played as a midfielder.

Club statistics
As of 22 July 2012

References

1980 births
Living people
Bulgarian footballers
First Professional Football League (Bulgaria) players
PFC Marek Dupnitsa players
PFC Rodopa Smolyan players
FC Lyubimets players
Association football midfielders